The Bisbee Bees were a Minor League Baseball team that represented Bisbee, Arizona from 1928 to 1941. The Bisbee Bees played as members of the Arizona State League (1928–1930) and Arizona–Texas League (1931–1932, 1937–1941). 

The Bees were an affiliate of the Chicago Cubs in 1930, Cincinnati Reds in 1937 and Chicago Cubs from 1939 to 1941.

External links
Baseball Reference
Article about the team

Baseball teams established in 1928
Baseball teams disestablished in 1941
Professional baseball teams in Arizona
Defunct Arizona-Texas League teams
Defunct Arizona State League teams
Cincinnati Reds minor league affiliates
Chicago Cubs minor league affiliates
1928 establishments in Arizona
1941 disestablishments in Arizona
Bisbee, Arizona
Arizona State League teams